Niphimycin is an antimicrobial made by Streptomyces.

References

Antimicrobials